Adam Ogilvie (1867 – after 1896) was a Scottish professional footballer who played as a goalkeeper.

References

1867 births
Scottish footballers
Association football goalkeepers
Forfar Athletic F.C. players
Grimsby Town F.C. players
Blackburn Rovers F.C. players
Shrewsbury Town F.C. players
English Football League players
Year of death missing